Robert Alliston McMichael (1921 – November 18, 2003) was a Canadian art collector and philanthropist. He is the founder of McMichael Canadian Art Collection.

In 1955, McMichael and his wife Signe (died July 4, 2007) began collecting Canadian paintings by the Group of Seven and other Canadian artists, such as Tom Thomson. 

In 1965, McMichael donated his collection and his house in Kleinburg, northwest of Toronto, with 14 acres of land to the Province of Ontario under the terms of a formal Agreement. The Agreement stated that the Government of Ontario would maintain the Collection and its special character in perpetuity and give the McMichaels lifelong membership on the Collection’s advisory committee, which controlled acquisitions. McMichael soon realized that he was losing control over the art acquisition process. In 1981 he resigned as director and after addressing the government through petitions and private representations, he sued the government in 1996 for breach of contract arguing that the Crown corporation, which managed the Collection, had reneged on the terms of the gift Agreement. The lawsuit culminated in a decision of the trial judge, Justice Peter Grossi of the Ontario Court’s General Division on November 15, 1996 in favour of the McMichaels. The decision, however, was appealed by the government in 1997.

As of 2009, the collection contained some 6,000 Canadian works.

McMichael died on November 18, 2003, of pneumonia following complications from a broken hip.

References

External links

1921 births
2003 deaths
Canadian philanthropists
20th-century philanthropists